Szaława is a Polish Coat of Arms. It was used by several szlachta families in the times of the Polish–Lithuanian Commonwealth.

History

Blazon

Azure, within and conjoined to an annulet three crosses formy in pall inverted Or.

Notable bearers

Notable bearers of this Coat of Arms include:

See also

 Polish heraldry
 Heraldry
 Coat of Arms
 List of Polish nobility coats of arms

Sources 
 Dynastic Genealogy
 Tadeusz Gajl Herby szlacheckie Rzeczypospolitej Obojga Narodów
 Some surnames of the list are copy from Polish Wikipedia: Szaława (herb szlachecki) - see Polish link.

External links 
  
  

Polish coats of arms